Jake Doran (born 18 July 2000) is an Australian athlete who competes as a sprinter. In 2022 he became Australian national champion over 100 metres and represented Australia at the World Athletics Championships and Commonwealth Games.

Early life
From Townsville, as a junior Doran broke the Australian junior 100m record with a 10.15 second run in Finland in July 2018 before representing Australia at the 2018 IAAF World U20 Championships in Tampere, Finland.

Career
Doran won gold in the 100m at the 2022 Oceania Athletics Championships having previously won the silver medal at the 2019 Oceania Athletics Championships in the same event. He also became national champion over 100 metres in 2022. Doran subsequently represented Australia at the World Athletics Championships and Commonwealth Games in 2022.

References

Living people
2000 births
People from Townsville
Australian male sprinters
Sportsmen from Queensland
World Athletics Championships athletes for Australia
Athletes (track and field) at the 2022 Commonwealth Games
Commonwealth Games competitors for Australia
21st-century Australian people